The Nendrum Monastery mill was a tide mill on an Mahee Island in Strangford Lough now in Northern Ireland. It is the earliest excavated tide mill, dating from 787 AD. Its millstones are 830mm in diameter and the horizontal wheel is estimated to have developed 7/8HP at its peak. Remains of an earlier mill dated at 619 AD were also found.

Further reading 
 McErlean, T. & Crothers, N.: “Harnessing the Tides: The Early Medieval Tide Mills at Nendrum Monastery, Strangford Lough”, 2007, The Stationery Office, UK, 
Rynne, Colin: Milling in the 7th Century – Europe's earliest tide mills, in: Archaeology Ireland 6, 1992

See also
Nendrum Monastery

External links 
Nendrum Monastery mill

Watermills in Northern Ireland
Buildings and structures in County Down
Archaeological sites in County Down
Tide mills